= List of executive orders by Manuel L. Quezon =

Listed below are executive orders signed by Philippine President Manuel L. Quezon.

== 1935 ==
No.	Title	Date signed	Ref.
1	Requiring All Officials and the Armed Forces of the Government to Take an Oath of Loyalty to the Constitution and of Allegiance to the United States	November 15, 1935	
2	Assuming Command of All the Armed Forces of the Government	November 15, 1935	
3	Appointing General Douglas MacArthur Military Adviser of the Commonwealth and Creating the National Defense Council	November 16, 1935	
4	Attestation of the Signature of the President, and Affixing the Great Seal, on Important Documents	November 20, 1935	
5	Reserving a Parcel of Land in the Barrio of Julugan, Municipality of Tanza, Province of Cavite, for School Purposes	November 20, 1935	
6	Order of Issue of City of Manila 1935 Thirty-Year 5 Per Cent Bonds	December 9, 1935	
7	Extending the Period Within Which the Amount Appropriated by Act No. 4184 Shall be Available	December 19, 1935	

== 1936 ==
No.	Title	Date signed	Ref.
8	Enforcing the Provisions of the Constitution on the Civil Service	January 2, 1936	
9	Creating a Committee to be Known as the General Committee of President Roosevelt's Birthday Celebration	January 10, 1936	
10	Army Promotion Regulations	January 11, 1936	
11	Designating the Chief of Staff and Transferring the Philippine Constabulary to the Army of the Philippines	January 10, 1936	
12	Reserve of 5 Per Cent of the Appropriations Authorized for the Year 1936	January 14, 1936	
13	Abolishing the Municipal Districts of Ampusungan and Tauit and Annexing Them as Barrios to the Municipal Districts of Bakun and Luna, Respectively, Mountain Province	January 21, 1936	
14	Creating a "Domestic Sugar Administration"	January 21, 1936	
15	Abolishing the Barrio of Cawa-Cawa, Municipality of Zamboanga, Province of Zamboanga, and Organizing the Sitio of Punta Gabilan, Said Municipality, into an Independent Barrio Under the Name of Punta Gabilan	February 3, 1936	
16	Prohibiting the Automatic Renewal of Contracts	February 3, 1936	
17	Reconstituting the National Economic Council	February 14, 1936	
18	Creating a Rice Commission for the Purpose of Studying and Making Recommendations on Ways and Means to Solve the Present Rice Crisis and to Insure a Permanent Supply of Rice at Reasonable Prices	February 17, 1936	
19	Creating a National Council of Education to Advise the Government on Educational Policies and Necessary Reforms in the Existing System of Education	February 19, 1936	
20	Fixing Office Hours on Saturdays and During the Hot Season	March 4, 1936	
21	Amending Executive Order No. 872, Dated September 27, 1935, Reissuing Temporary Rules and Regulations with Reference to the Purchase, Sale, and Hourding of Palay and Rice.	March 5, 1936	
22	Constituting a Committee on Pensions and Appointing the Members Thereof	March 17, 1936	
23	Description and Specification of the Filipino Flag	March 25, 1936	
24	Expenditure of P75,000 of the 5 Per Cent Required Savings of the Department of Justice	April 11, 1936	
25	Creating the Budget Commission	April 25, 1936	
26	Designating the Permanent Chief of Staff and Announcing Certain Appointments of General Officers of the Army of the Philippines	May 4, 1936	
27	Order of Issue, Province of Cebu Thirty-Year 5 Per Cent Bonds	May 4, 1936	
28	Order of Issue, Province of Negros Occidental Thirty-Year 5 Per Cent Bonds	May 13, 1936	
29	Order of Issue, Municipality of Iloilo, Iloilo, Thirty-Year 5 Per Cent Bonds	May 11, 1936	
30	Conduct of Public Affairs During the President's Absence	May 13, 1936	
31	Procurement of Medical Reserve Officers	May 18, 1936	
32	Prescribing Uniform Fees for Copies of Official Records and Documents Furnished Private Persons and Entities	May 25, 1936	
33	Creating the Deportation Board	May 29, 1936	
34	Transferring the Navigation Division, Department of Agriculture and Commerce, to the Bureau of Customs, Department of Finance	June 1, 1936	
35	Fixing Office Hours on Saturdays and During the Rainy Season in the City of Baguio	June 2, 1936	
36	Cordage Allotment for 1936-1937	June 3, 1936	
37	Organizing the Municipal Districts of Kolambugan and Buruun, Province of Lanao, into an Independent Municipality Under the Name of Kolambugan	June 4, 1936	
38	Authorizing the Army of the Philippines to Utilize Teacher's Camp, Baguio, for Conducting the Philippine Military Academy	June 4, 1936	
39	Reorganizing the Bureau of Civil Service and Creating the Civil Service Board of Appeals	June 23, 1936	
40	Reorganizing the Bureau of Justice	June 25, 1936	
41	Transfer of Administrative Supervision Over the Bureau of Prisons to the Philippine Army	June 29, 1936	
42	Transferring the Executive Supervision Over Offices of Provincial, City, and Municipal Treasurers from the Department of the Interior to the Department of Finance	June 30, 1936	
43	Transferring Certain Functions and Duties of the Bureau of Science to Other Entities Under the Commonwealth of the Philippines	June 30, 1936	
44	Transferring the Collection of Radio Registration Fees from the Bureau of Posts to the Bureau of Internal Revenue, Providing for Corresponding Adjustments Incident Thereto and for Other Purposes	June 30, 1936	
45	Creating a National Transportation Board to Advise the Government on the Improvement of Land, Marine, and Air Transportation Facilities	July 6, 1936	
46	Designation of Officers and Employees Who May be Granted Deferment from Their Trainee Instruction for a Period Not to Exceed Three Years	July 7, 1936	
47	Road and Street Rights-of-Way Through Public Land	July 7, 1936	
48	Fixing Quarters Allowance for General Officers of the High Command of the Army of the Philippines	July 20, 1936	
49	Increasing and Fixing the Minimum Daily Wage to be Paid to Common Laborers Employed by the National Government in the Different Provinces and Chartered Cities	August 19, 1936	
50	Fixing the Minimum Salary That Should be Paid to Employees of the National Government	June 29, 1936	
51	Organization of Certain Sitios in the Municipality of Polillo, Tayabas, into an Independent Barrio Under the Name of Magdalo	August 31, 1936	
52	Consolidation of Official Warehouse Receipt-Permit for Domestic Consumption or Emergency Reserve Sugar	September 8, 1936	
53	Amending Executive Order No. 8, Current Series, by Providing a New Time Limit for Civil Service Qualification for Employees Therein Mentioned	September 9, 1936	
54	Domestic Consumption and Emergency Reserve Sugar Allotments for 1937	September 14, 1936	
55	Creating a National Electrical-Communication Board to Advise the Government Upon Matters Pertaining to Electrical Communications	September 25, 1936	
56	Organizing the Barrios of Danawin and Kilbay, Municipality of Ragay, Camarines Sur, into an Independent Municipality, Under a Name to be Decided Upon by the Inhabitants Thereof Through a Plebiscite, with the Seat of Government in the Barrio of Danawin	October 5, 1936	
57	Establishing Reserve Officers' Training Units in the Philippines	October 14, 1936	
58	Recognizing Reserve Officers' Training in the Collegiate Department of San Juan de Letran College	October 14, 1936	
59	Transferring the Seat of Government of the Municipal District of Kabasalan, Zamboanga, From Its Present Location at the Barrio of Naga to the Barrio of Kabasalan	October 21, 1936	
60	Authorizing the Acceptance of Philippine Commonwealth Bonds as Security for All Undertakings for Which the Giving of a Bond or Security is Required by Law	October 23, 1936	
61	Creating a National Relief Board	November 3, 1936	
62	Additional Cordage Allotment for 1936-1937	November 4, 1936	
63	Requiring the Commissioner of Public Safety, the Provost Marshal General as Head of the Constabulary Division of the Philippine Army, Every Mayor of a Chartered City, and Every Municipal President to Detail and Organize Special Members of the Police Force, Local, National, and the Constabulary to Watch, Capture, and Prosecute Offenders Against the Laws and Ordinances Enacted to Prevent Cruelty to Animals	November 12, 1936	
64	Organizing the Municipal Districts of Malita and Pantukan, Province of Davao, into Independent Municipalities Under the Names of Malita and Pantukan, with the Seats of Government in the Barrios of Malita and Pantukan	November 13, 1936	
65	Organizing the Barrio of Buenavista, Together with the Sitios Belonging to the Said Barrio, Municipality of Butuan, Agusan, into an Independent Municipality, Under the Name of Buenavista, with the Seat of Government in the Barrio of Buenavista	November 19, 1936	
66	Organizing the Municipal Districts of Daguma, Isulan, Maganuy, Reina Regente, Talayan, and the Southern Portion of the Municipal District of Dulawan and the Municipal District of Libuñgan and the Northern Portion of the Municipal District of Dulawan, Province of Cotabato, into Independent Municipalities Under the Names of Dulawan and Midsayap	November 25, 1936	
67	Delegating to the Secretary of Agriculture and Commerce the Power to Sign Patents and Certificates	November 28, 1936	
68	Creating a Flood Control Commission to Advise the Government in the Planning and Construction of River and Sea Protection and Other Related Works	December 1, 1936	
69	Transferring the Seat of the Municipal District Government of Bongao, Province of Sulu, from Its Present Location at Bongao to the Barrio of Batobato	December 2, 1936	
70	Organizing the Sitio of Laca, Barrio of Kinagbaan, Jagna, Bohol, into an Independent Barrio Under the Same Name	December 2, 1936	
71	Establishing a Classification of Roads	December 3, 1936	
72	Establishing a Classification of Ports	December 3, 1936	
73	Establishing a Classification of Airports and Landing Fields	December 3, 1936	
74	Transferring Some of the Records of the Bureau of the Treasury to the Securities and Exchange Commission	December 7, 1936	
75	Authorizing the Domestic Sugar Administrator to Issue Necessary Rules and Regulations	December 7, 1936	
76	Creating the Board of Food Inspection	December 22, 1936	
77	Organizing the Ten Municipal Districts in the Province of Zamboanga into Five Municipalities	December 23, 1936	
78	Abolishing the Municipal District of Namaltugan, Mountain Province, and Annexing Its Barrios to the Following Municipal Districts: Namaltugan to the Municipal District of Bayag and Tayangan and Dibagat to the Municipal District of Kabugao	December 23, 1936	
79	Giving Government Officers and Employees Detailed to Census Work Under Commonwealth Act No. 170, Recess from Their Regular Duties During Such Detail	December 23, 1936	
80	Providing for a Preliminary Enumeration of Dwellings with the Forthcoming Taking of a New Census in the Philippines Under Commonwealth Act No. 170	December 23, 1936	
81	Transferring the Immigration Division in the Bureau of Customs, Together with Its Personnel, Supplies, Records, Equipment, or Any Other Property, and Appropriation to the Department of Labor	December 28, 1936	

== 1937 ==
No.	Title	Date signed	Ref.
82	Revoking Executive Order No. 41, Dated June 29, 1936	January 4, 1937	
83	Designating the Board of Indeterminate Sentence to Act as a Board of Pardons	January 11, 1937	
84	Ordering the Taking of Complete Classified Data on Real Property Ownership, Improvement, and Assessment Before Census Day, Designating Census Officers to Assist in This Work, and for Other Purposes	January 20, 1937	
85	Abolishing and Reorganizing All the Existing Barrios Comprised Within the New Municipality of Dulawan, Cotabato	January 22, 1937	
86	Abolishing and Reorganizing All the Existing Barrios Comprised Within the New Municipality of Midsayap, Cotabato	January 22, 1937	
87	Prescribing Instruction to be Followed in the Conduct of Public Affairs During the Time that the President is Outside the Philippines	January 23, 1937	
88	Prescribing Regulations Governing the Receipt and Acceptance of Donations of Money for the National Defense and the Expenditure Thereof	January 23, 1937	
89	Prescribing Regulations Regarding Transportation Allowances of Provincial and City Government Officials and Employees and Revoking Executive Order No. 457 Series of 1933	January 23, 1937	
90	Creating the National Board of Surveys and Maps	January 23, 1937	
91	Creating the Philippines Historical Committee	January 23, 1937	
92	Requiring That a Reserve of 5 Per Cent be Set Up from the General Appropriations Authorized for the Year 1937 Under Commonwealth Act No. 38	January 23, 1937	
93	Placing Under the Control of the Division of Purchase and Supply All Unused and Dormant Supplies and Equipment of the National Government, and Requiring the Approval of the Commissioner of the Budget on All Requisitions and Orders for Supplies, Materials, Furniture, and Equipment	January 23, 1937	
94	Fixing the Office Hours During the Hot Season	March 29, 1937	
95	Organization of the Sitio of Buli, Barrio of Malindig of the Municipality of Bauan, Batangas, into an Independent Barrio Under the Name of San Diego	April 6, 1937	
96	Segregating the Barrio of San Francisco from the Municipality of Talavera, Province of Nueva Ecija, and Annexing the Same to the Municipality of Santo Domingo, Same Province	April 24, 1937	
97	Requiring the Submission of Monthly Reports Showing the Trend of Revenue Collections and Expenditures	April 24, 1937	
98	Amending Executive Order No. 16, Dated February 3, 1936 Entitled "Prohibiting the Automatic Renewal of Contracts" by Requiring Public Bidding Before Entering into New Contracts	April 24, 1937	
99	Regulations Governing the Pay and Emoluments of Officials and Employees of the Government Called for Military Training or to Extended Tour of Active Duty in the Philippine Army	June 14, 1937	
100	Regulations Governing Quarters Allowances of Philippine Army Officers	June 14, 1937	
101	Cordage Allotment for 1937-1938	June 14, 1937	
102	Prescribing Specifications for Portland Cement	June 14, 1937	
103	Directing All Bureaus, Offices, and Branches of the Government to Turn Over to the National Library All Public Records, Papers, or Documents of Historical Significance	June 14, 1937	
104	Coursing of Official Correspondence to the United States and to Foreign Countries	June 14, 1937	
105	Amending Executive Order No. 49, Series of 1936, Entitled "Increasing and Fixing the Minimum Daily Wage to be Paid to Common Laborers Employed by the National Government in the Different Provinces and Chartered Cities" so as to Fix a Minimum Daily Wage of P1.25 for Common Laborers Employed by the National Government in the City of Manila and P1 for Those Employed in the Different Provinces and Chartered Cities	August 16, 1937	
106	Promulgating Rules and Regulations Governing Arrest of Officers and Enlisted Men of the Philippine Army	August 24, 1937	
107	Designating the Commission of Health and Welfare to Take Charge of Collecting the Information and Furnishing the Reports Desired by the Permanent Central Opium Board	August 24, 1937	
108	Authorizing the Repurchase of Lands Levied and Sold on Execution for Failure to Pay Irrigation Charges	August 24, 1937	
109	Procedure to be Followed in the Repair of Typewriters and Similar Equipment of the Various Offices of the National, Provincial, City, and the Municipal Governments	August 24, 1937	
110	Amending Executive Order No. 102, Dated June 14, 1937, Prescribing Specifications for Standard Portland Cement and High-Silica Content Cement	August 30, 1937	
111	Prohibiting and Restricting the Practice of Nepotism	August 30, 1937	
112	Prescribing Rules and Regulations to Govern the Use of Transportation for Official Purposes	August 31, 1937	
113	Extending the Cebu Burnt District	August 31, 1937	
114	Requiring That Communities to be Organized into Political Divisions or Subdivisions Shall Have Well Defined Boundaries	August 31, 1937	
115	Requiring the Approval of the Secretary of Public Works and Communications in the Construction and Operation of Any Government Radio Station and Authorizing the Granting of General Authority to the Philippine Army to Establish and Operate Radio Stations for Military Purposes	September 1, 1937	
116	Requiring Government Offices to Have Shop Repair and Manufacturing Work Done at the Government Marine Railway and Repair Shops with Certain Exceptions	September 1, 1937	
117	Providing for the Manner of Enforcing the Provisions of the State Police Law	September 11, 1937	
118	Creating a "Philippine Sugar Administration"	September 16, 1937	
119	Creating an Anniversary Committee to Formulate Plans and Devise Ways and Means for the Appropriate Celebration Every Year of November 15th	September 18, 1937	
120	Regulating the Registration of, and Assignment of Number Plates to, Motor Vehicles Used by Government Officials	September 24, 1937	
121	Creating a Government Quarters Committee	October 6, 1937	
122	Creating a National Unemployment Board	October 8, 1937	
123	Promulgating Regulations to Govern Salvage Work in the Philippines	October 15, 1937	
124	Annexing a Certain Portion of the Barrio of Daanghari, Municipality of Navotas, Rizal, to the Poblacion of Said Municipality	October 23, 1937	
125	Creating a Lighthouse Board	October 25, 1937	
126	Transferring from the Division of Purchase and Supply to the Budget Office of the Control of Unused and Dormant Supplies and Equipment of the National Government and Extending the Application of Executive Order Numbered Ninety-Three, Current Series, to Orders for the Manufacture of Supplies, Materials, Furniture and Equipment, and for the Repair of Furniture and Equipment, Including Those Filed with Bureaus and Offices Other Than the Division of Purchase and Supply	November 4, 1937	
127	Creating an Advisory Abaca Committee	November 9, 1937	
128	Use of Family Surnames in the Census of the Philippines	November 16, 1937	
129	Annexing the Barrio of Bughayan of the Municipality of Butuan, Province of Bohol, to the Barrio of Cantigdas of the Same Municipality	November 20, 1937	
130	Amending Executive Order No. 61, Dated November 3, 1936, Entitled "Creating a National Relief Board," so as to Designate the Commissioner of Health and Welfare as Member and Executive Officer of Said Board	November 20, 1937	
131	Directing the Director of Mines Personally, or Through His Authorized Representatives, to Conduct Underground Mine Inspections in Representation of the Secretary of Labor	December 23, 1937	
132	Procedure to be Followed in the Acquisition of Private Property for Public Use and Creating Appraisal Committees	December 27, 1937	
133	Confirming the Election of Provincial and City Officers Elected on December 14, 1937	December 29, 1937	
134	Proclaiming the National Language of the Philippines Based on the "Tagalog" Language	December 30, 1937	
135	Establishing a Classification of Roads (Revising Executive Order No. 71)	December 31, 1937	
136	Amending Executive Order No. 73, Series of 1936, Establishing and Classifying Airports and Landing Fields	December 31, 1937	
137	Attestation of the Signature of the President, and Affixing the Great Seal, on Important Documents	December 31, 1937	

== 1938 ==
No.	Title	Date signed	Ref.
138	Providing for the Collection and Compilation of Historical Data Regarding Barrios, Municipalities, or Cities, and Provinces of the Philippines	January 3, 1938	
139	Creating a National Relief Administration	January 14, 1938	
140	Fixing the Salaries of the Officers of the Philippine Army	February 7, 1938	
141	Organizing the Sitio of Tignuan, Barrio of Kapalong, Municipality of Infanta, Tayabas, into a Barrio Under the Name of Tignuan	February 11, 1938	
142	Promulgating Regulations to Govern the Administration and Collection of Delinquent Irrigation Fees from Landowners Under Irrigation Systems Constructed Under the Provisions of Act No. 2152, as Amended; Fixing Adjusted Irrigation Fees for Said Systems, and Prescribing the Manner of Collecting Same	February 15, 1938	
143	Segregating from the Municipality of Guimbal, Province of Iloilo, the Former Municipality of Tubungan, and Organizing the Same into an Independent Municipality Under the Name of Tubungan, with the Seat of Government in the Barrio of Tubungan	March 15, 1938	
144	Creating a Council of State	March 17, 1938	
145	Fixing Office Hours on Saturdays and During the Hot Season	March 18, 1938	
146	Enforcement of the London Sugar Agreement	April 1, 1938	
147	Authorizing the Commissioner of the Budget to Take Party in the Deliberations of the Cabinet in Certain Matters	April 8, 1938	
148	Policy Regarding Applications for Public Lands and Public Forests to be Devoted for Pasture Purposes	April 22, 1938	
149	Authorizing the Secretary to the President to Sign Certain Deeds or Contracts	April 22, 1938	
150	Cordage Allotment for 1938-39	April 28, 1938	
151	Promulgating Rules and Regulations Governing the Arrest, Custody, and Trial of Persons Subject to the Military or Naval Laws of the United States	April 30, 1938	
152	Organizing the Barrios of Bondo, Ilayang Tayuman, Ibabang Tayuman, Cawayan, Inabuan, Silongin, Kasay, Mañongon, and Pagsangahan, All of the Municipality of Mulanay, Tayabas, into an Independent Municipality Under the Name of Bondo	April 30, 1938	
153	Reorganizing the Philippine Constabulary into a National Police Force	June 23, 1938	
154	Designating the Cebu Landing Field as a Military Airport and Landing Field, and Amending for This Purpose Executive Order No. 73, Dated December 3, 1936, Entitled "Establishing a Classification of Airports and Landing Fields"	June 24, 1938	
155	Listing the Salaries and Allocations of the Officers of the Army of the Philippines	July 23, 1938	
156	Reorganization and Administration of Local Police Forces	August 1, 1938	
157	Creating the National Sugar Board	August 17, 1938	
158	Organizing the Barrio of Angono, Municipality of Binangonan, Province of Rizal, into an Independent Municipality Under the Name of Angono	August 19, 1938	
159	Organizing Certain Barrios of the Municipality of Dao in the Province of Capiz, into an Independent Municipality Under the Name of Cuartero	August 23, 1938	
160	Creating a Tax Commission	August 23, 1938	
161	Promulgating Regulations to Govern the Administration and Collection of Delinquent Irrigation Fees from Landowners Under Irrigation Systems Constructed Under the Provisions of Act Numbered Two Thousand One Hundred Fifty-Two, as Amended, Fixing Adjusted Irrigation Fees for Said Systems and Prescribing the Manner of Collecting Same, and Revoking Executive Order Numbered One Hundred Forty-two, Dated February Fifteen, Nineteen Hundred and Thirty-Eight	August 23, 1938	
162	Amending Paragraph One of Executive Order Numbered Ninety-Nine, Dated June Fourteenth, Nineteen Hundred and Thirty-Seven, Entitled "Regulations Governing the Pay and Emoluments of Officials and Employees of the Government Called for Military Training or to Extend Tour of Active Duty in the Philippine Army"	September 5, 1938	
163	Deputizing Chairmen of Provincial Civil Service Examining Committees to Provisionally Authorize for the Commissioner of Civil Service Appointments in the Local Provincial and Municipal Branches of the Government	September 6, 1938	
164	Temporarily Closing the Port of Cebu as a Port of Entry to Immigrants Coming to the Philippines	September 24, 1938	
165	Amending Certain Barrios and Sitios of the Municipality of Santa Lucia, Ilocos Sur, to the Municipality of Bauguen, Same Province	September 27, 1938	
166	Regulations Governing the Half-Masting of Flags on Government Buildings	October 8, 1938	
167	Revising the Instructions Delimiting the Respective Responsibilities of the Secretary of the Interior and the Secretary of Finance in the Supervision and Control of the Personnel and Finances of the Provincial, City, and Municipal Governments	October 8, 1938	
168	Amending Section 6 of Executive Order No. 157, Dated August 17, 1938, Entitled "Creating the National Sugar Board"	October 15, 1938	
169	Regulations Governing Seniority, Promotion, and Elimination of Officers of the Regular Force, Philippine Army	October 15, 1938	
170	Amending Paragraph (2) of Executive Order No. 161, Dated August 23, 1938, Entitled "Promulgating Regulations to Govern the Administration and Collection of Delinquent Irrigation Fees from Landowners Under Irrigation Systems Constructed Under the Provisions of Act No. 2152, as Amended, Fixing Adjusted Irrigation Fees for Said Systems and Prescribing the Manner of Collecting Same, and Revoking Executive Order No. 142, Dated February 15, 1938"	October 18, 1938	
171	Creating a National Fire Prevention Board	October 18, 1938	
172	Regulations Governing the Use of Motor Vehicles or Other Means of Transportation for Official Purposes	October 18, 1938	
173	Changing the Date of Gathering and Compiling Statistical Data on Real Property from March 31, 1937, as Provided in Executive Order No. 81, Dated January 20, 1937, to Census Day, January 1, 1939	November 7, 1938	
174	Prescribing Rules to Covers the Rates of Compensation at Which New Appointments and Promotions in the Positions Subject to the Provisions of Commonwealth Act No. 402 May be Authorized	November 7, 1938	
175	Revising the Rules and Regulations Relative to the Administration and Supervision of Local Police Forces	November 11, 1938	
176	Designating the Secretary of the Interior to Exercise Supervision Over Local Police Forces	December 1, 1938	
177	Amending the Barrio of Balaybay, Municipality of Subic, Province of Zambales, to the Municipality of Castillejos, Same Province	December 12, 1938	
178	Prescribing the Procedure, Including Modes of Proof, in Cases Before Courts-Martial, Courts of Inquiry, Military Commissions and Other Military Tribunals of the Army of the Philippines	December 17, 1938	
179	Designating a Chief of Staff Under the Provisions of Commonwealth Act No. 312	December 31, 1938	

== 1939 ==
No.	Title	Date signed	Ref.
180	Organizing the Sitio of Bubuyan, Barrio of Sapak, Municipality of Lipa, Batangas, into A Barrior Under the Name of Santo Niño	January 27, 1939	
181	Organizing a Certain Portion of the Municipality of Santiago, Isabela, into an Independent Municipality under the Name of Cardon	January 27, 1939	
182	Designating the Secretary of the Interior to Exercise Supervision Over the Philippine Constabulary	January 30, 1939	
183	Physical and Medical Examination of Proposed Appointees in the Classified Service of the Government as Well as in the University of the Philippines and Government-Owned or Controlled Corporations	February 2, 1939	
184	Promulgating Rules on Mobilization	February 2, 1939	
185	Organizing Certain Barrios in the Municipality of Unisan in the Province of Tayabas, into an Independent Municipality Under the Name of Agdangan	February 3, 1939	
186	Promulgating Rules and Regulations Governing the Loss of Firearms Held Under the Provisions of Section 881 of the Revised Administrative Code	February 11, 1939	
187	Prescribing Regulations Governing the Granting of Allowances for the Partial Support of Dependent or Dependents of Trainees, Who, After the Termination of the Period of Deferment by Reason of Dependency, are Selected to Undergo Trainee Instruction	February 17, 1939	
188	Revising Executive Order No. 139, Dated January 14, 1938, Creating a National Relief Administration	February 23, 1939	
189	Creating the Philippine Committee on Geographical Names	February 28, 1939	
190	Allotting the Portions of the Appropriations Authorized by Commonwealth Act No. 300, Which May be Used for the Expenditures of the Executive Departments of the National Government During the Period from January 1 to June 30, 1939	February 28, 1939	
191	Creating the Rural Progress Administration	March 2, 1939	
192	Amending Executive Order No. 31, Dated May 18, 1936, so as to Delete Paragraph 5-d (3) Thereof	March 8, 1939	
193	Designating the Government Boards of Examiners as Advisory Committees on Technical Matters to the Office of Private Education	March 13, 1939	
194	Revising Executive Order No. 135, Dated December 31, 1937, Establishing a Classification of Roads	March 13, 1939	
195	Revising Executive Order No. 72, Dated December 3, 1936, Establishing a Classification of Ports	March 13, 1939	
196	Fixing Office Hours on Saturdays and During the Hot Season	March 24, 1939	
197	Revising Further Executive Order No. 139, Dated January 14, 1938, Creating a National Relief Administration, as Revised by Executive Order No. 188, Dated February 23, 1939	March 24, 1939	
198	Making Allotments of the Appropriations for the Philippine Army Authorized by Commonwealth Act No. 300, in Addition to Those Included in Executive Order No. 190, Current Series, for Expenditures of the Executive Departments of the National Government During the Period from January 1 to June 30, 1939	April 4, 1939	
199	Fixing the Maximum Weight of Baggage and Household Effects of Government Officers and Employees When Transferred by Competent Authority from One Station to Another, Including Those of the Members of Their Families, That May be Transported at Government Expense	April 4, 1939	
200	Amending Paragraph (7) of Executive Order No. 161, Dated August 23, 1938, Entitled "Promulgating Regulations to Govern the Administration and Collection of Delinquent Irrigation Fees from Landowners Under Irrigation Systems Constructed Under the Provisions of Act No. 2152, as Amended, Fixing Adjusted Irrigation Fees for Said Systems and Prescribing the Manner of Collecting Same, and Revoking Executive Order No. 142, Dated February 15, 1938."	April 11, 1939	
201	Amending Paragraph 1 of Executive Order No. 99, Dated June 14, 1937, Entitled "Regulations Governing the Pay and Emoluments of Officials and Employees of the Government Called for Military Training or to Extended Tour of Active Duty in the Philippine Army"	April 15, 1939	
202	Requiring That Savings of 5 Per Cent be Set Up from the Releases Made in Executive Orders Nos. 190 and 198, Current Series, for the First Six Months of 1939, from the General Appropriations Authorized in Commonwealth Act No. 300	April 18, 1939	
203	Designating Philippine Army Extra Cantonment Zones in All Mobilization Centers and Empowering the Director of Health to Promulgate All Needful Health Rules and Regulations Therein	May 3, 1939	
204	Making an Additional Allotment from the Appropriation for Aid to the City of Manila Authorized by Commonwealth Act No. 300	May 30, 1939	
205	Prescribing the Policy to be Observed in the Promotion of Retired Officers of the Philippine Army Recalled to Active Duty	May 31, 1939	
206	Authorizing the Conversion of the Rural Progress Administration Created by Executive Order No. 191 into a Corporation	May 31, 1939	
207	Requiring the Establishment of ROTC Units in All Colleges and Universities as a Requisite to Recognition by the Government	June 15, 1939	
208	Amending Executive Order No. 194, Dated March 13, 139, Entitled "Revising Executive Order No. 135, Dated December 31, 1937, Establishing a Classification of Roads"	June 15, 1939	
209	Revoking Executive Order No. 202, Current Series, Entitled "Requiring That Savings of 5 Per Cent be Set Up from the Releases Made in Executive Orders Nos. 190 and 198, Current Series, for the First Six Months of 1939, from the General Appropriations Authorized in Commonwealth Act No. 300"	June 23, 1939	
210	Amending Executive Order No. 118 (Creating the Philippine Sugar Administration)	June 23, 1939	
211	Making Additional Allotments for Various Purposes from the Appropriations Authorized Under Commonwealth Act No. 300	June 23, 1939	
212	Regulations Governing Seniority, Promotion, and Separation from the Service, of Officers of the Reserve Force, Philippine Army	July 6, 1939	
213	Annexing a Certain Portion of the Territory of the Municipality of Majayjay, Province of Laguna, to the Municipality of Lilio, Same Province	July 10, 1939	
214	Composition of the Appraisal Committee Created Under Executive Order No. 132, Dated December 27, 1937	July 10, 1939	
215	Revising Executive Order No. 115 Entitled "Requiring the Approval of the Secretary of Public Works and Communications in the Construction and Operation of Any Government Radio Station and Authorizing the Granting of General Authority to the Philippine Army to Establish and Operate Radio Stations for Military Purposes"	July 22, 1939	
216	Composition of the National Relief Board Created Under Executive Order No. 197, Dated March 24, 1939	July 28, 1939	
217	Prescribing Certain Civic and Ethical Principles to be Taught in All Schools in the Philippines	August 19, 1939	
218	Amending Executive Order No. 166, Dated October 8, 1938, Regarding Regulations Governing the Half-Masting of Flags on Government Buildings	August 25, 1939	
219	Suspending the Effectivity of Executive Order No. 213, Dated July 10, 1939	August 31, 1939	
220	Segregating from the Municipality of Banate, Province of Iloilo, the Former Municipality of Anilao, and Organizing the Same into a Separate Municipality Under the Name of Anilao	September 8, 1939	
221	Prohibiting the Filling of Vacant Positions and Increases in Salary in the Government	September 9, 1939	
222	Prescribing the Office Hours to be Observed in the Different Bureaus and Offices of the Government	September 13, 1939	
223	Amending Section 3, Rule VII, of the Civil Service Rules Regarding Reinstatement	September 25, 1939	
224	Amending Executive Order No. 220, Dated September 8, 1939	September 28, 1939	
225	Granting Quarters or the Commuted Value Thereof, to Officers of the United States Army Who are Commissioned in the Philippine Army by Reason of Their Acceptance of Assimilated Rank Therein	September 30, 1939	
226	Authorizing the Emergency Control Board to Conduct Investigations and to Punish Acts of Noncooperation to Attain Objectives of Commonwealth Act No. 498	October 24, 1939	
227	Prohibiting Reappointment of Justices of the Peace Retired Under Commonwealth Act No. 331 to Any Position in the Local Governments Unless They Waive Their Retirement Gratuity	October 25, 1939	
228	Consolidating into One Police Unit All Agencies Performing Police Duties Within the Harbor and Port Areas in All Ports of Entry	October 31, 1939	
229	Cordage Allotments for May 1, 1939 to December 31, 1939	October 31, 1939	
230	Organizing the Department of National Defense	October 31, 1939	
231	Order of Issue, City of Bacolod, Thirty-Year 5 Per Cent Bonds	November 4, 1939	
232	Extending the Area of the Customs Zone in Manila	November 8, 1939	
233	Fixing the Maximum Selling Prices of Certain Articles of Prime Necessity	November 8, 1939	
234	Directing the Board of Indeterminate Sentence to Look into the Record of Military Prisoners Confined in Penitentiaries and to Make Proper Recommendations for the Release of Such Prisoners on Parole	November 8, 1939	
235	Eliminating the Distinction Between Spanish and English Examinations Relative to the Maximum Salary Allowable	November 17, 1939	
236	Providing for a Special Permit System to Authorize Importers, Wholesalers, and Retailers to Trade at Higher Prices Than Those Fixed in Executive Order No. 233	November 29, 1939	
237	Amending Executive Order No. 233, Dated November 8, 1939, Entitled "Fixing the Maximum Selling Prices or Certain Articles of Prime Necessity"	November 29, 1939	
238	Authorizing, Until Further Orders, the Secretary to the President of the Philippines to Allocate and Reallocate the Quotas for All Articles Established for the Philippines By Public Act No. 127 of the Congress of the United States, Approved March 24, 1934, as Amended, and to Issue Export Permits Therefor	December 14, 1939	
239	Amending Executive Order No. 135, Dated December 31, 1937, as Amended by Executive Order No. 194, Dated March 13, 1939, Establishing a Classification of Roads	December 16, 1939	
240	Transferring the Seat of the Municipal District Government of Tandubas, Province of Sulu, from Its Present Location at Tandubas to the Barrio of Si Kubung Tausan	December 21, 1939	
241	Organizing a Certain Portion of the Municipality of Jaro, Iloilo, into a Regular Municipality Under the Name of Leganes	December 23, 1939	
242	Organizing a Certain Portion of the Municipality of Tangub, Misamis Occidental, into a Regular Municipality Under the Name of Bonifacio	December 28, 1939	
243	Creating a Traffic Commission	December 29, 1939	
244	Fixing January 1, 1940, as the Date for the Initial Allocations of Positions, by Virtue of Commonwealth Act No. 402, and Prescribing the Procedure for Such Allocations	December 31, 1939	
245	Abolishing the National Information Office (Board) and Transferring Its Powers, Functions, and Duties, as Well as Its Personnel, Appropriations, and Properties, to the Department of the Interior; and Effecting Certain Adjustments of the Personnel of the Said Department	December 31, 1939	
246	Effecting Certain Adjustments of the Personnel of the Office of the Secretary of the Department of Agriculture and Commerce, the Bureau of Lands, and the Bureau of Forestry, and Abolishing the Division of Veterinary Research in the Bureau of Animal Industry and Creating a Division of Parasitology and Protozoology and a Division of Pathology and Bacteriology in Lieu Thereof	December 31, 1939	
247	Abolishing the Bureau of Labor and Transferring All Its Functions to the Department of Labor, and Effecting Certain Adjustments of the Personnel Thereof	December 31, 1939	

== 1940 ==
No.	Title	Date signed	Ref.
248	Further Amending Executive Order No. 233, Dated November 8, 1939, Entitled "Fixing the Maximum Selling Prices of Certain Articles of Prime Necessity"	January 2, 1940	
249	Creating the National Trading Corporation	January 4, 1940	
250	Creating a Committee to Make a Study of, and Recommend Ways and Means for the Organization of a Reservists Association	January 10, 1940	
251	Creating a Decoration to be Known as the Medal of Honor and Prescribing Rules and Regulations for Its Award	January 17, 1940	
252	Granting Authority to the Commissioner of the Census to Order and Approve the Publication of Census Reports	January 23, 1940	
253	Further Amending Executive Order No. 233, Dated November 8, 1939, Entitled "Fixing the Maximum Selling Prices of Certain Articles of Prime Necessity"	February 14, 1940	
254	Revising Executive Order No. 195, Dated March 13, 1939 Establishing a Classification of Ports	February 20, 1940	
255	Fixing and Regulating the Collection of Wharf or Pier Charges for the Use of Port Facilities	February 21, 1940	
256	Amending Paragraph 6 of Executive Order No. 169, Dated October 15, 1938	March 1, 1940	
257	Amending Executive Order No. 33, Creating the Deportation Board	March 12, 1940	
258	Authorizing the Payment of the Salaries or Wages of Newly Appointed or Transferred Officers and Employees of the National, Provincial, City, and Municipal Governments While Their Appointments are Pending Action by the Proper Authorities	March 12, 1940	
259	Regulations Governing Official Travel Abroad	March 12, 1940	
260	Extending the Application of Certain Provisions of Administrative Order No. 68 Dated March 17, 1938, to the Creation and Filling of Positions Carrying Compensation at Three Thousand Pesos or More Per Annum in the Provincial Governments, Chartered Cities, and Corporations Owned or Controlled by the Government and Their Subsidiaries	March 12, 1940	
261	Amending Executive Order No. 253, Dated February 14, 1940, Entitled "Further Amending Executive Order No. 233, Dated November 8, 1939, Entitled 'Fixing the Maximum Selling Prices of Certain Articles of Prime Necessities'"	March 19, 1940	
262	Revising Executive Order No. 32, Dated May 25, 1936, Prescribing Uniform Fees for Copies of Official Records and Documents Furnished Private Persons and Entities	April 1, 1940	
263	Authorizing the Printing of the Dictionary and Grammar of the National Language, and Fixing the Day from Which Said Language Shall be Used and Taught in the Public and Private Schools of the Philippines	April 1, 1940	
264	Appointment and Separation of Secret Agents or Detectives and Confidential Employees	April 1, 1940	
265	Declaring Certain Positions as Primarily Confidential in Accordance with the Provisions of Section 1(g) of Commonwealth Act No. 402 and Amending for This Purpose the Second Paragraph of Section 1 of Executive Order No. 244 Dated December 31, 1939	April 4, 1940	
266	Organizing a Certain Portion of the Municipality of Cagayan, Oriental Misamis, into an Independent Municipality Under the Name of Alubijid	April 15, 1940	
267	Organization of the Philippine Army Nurse Corps Reserve	April 15, 1940	
268	Requiring the Prompt and Direct Submission of Papers to the Auditor General	April 25, 1940	
269	Requiring That the Opening of All Bids and All Public Competitive Biddings be Made in the Presence of a Representative of the Auditor General	April 25, 1940	
270	Amending Executive Order No. 255, Entitled "Fixing and Regulating the Collection of Wharf or Pier Charges for the Use of Port Facilities"	April 25, 1940	
271	Modifying Paragraph 2 of Executive Order No. 221, Dated September 9, 1939, Regarding Increases in Salary in the Same Position	May 11, 1940	
272	Transferring the Powers and Duties of the Secretary of Public Works and Communications and the Secretary of the Interior Under Act No. 3997 and Commonwealth Act No. 98, Respectively, to the Secretary of National Defense	May 11, 1940	
273	Regulations Governing the Use of the Flag of the United States, the Flag of the Philippines, and the Flags of Other Nations	May 11, 1940	
274	Fixing the Schedule of Per Diems for Provincial, City and Municipal Officers and Employees	May 11, 1940	
275	Transferring the Seat of Government of the Municipality of Lupi, Camarines Sur, from Its Present Location at the Barrio of San Pedro to the Sitio of Tapi, Barrio of Cabutagan	May 11, 1940	
276	Prescribing Uniform Procedure to be Followed in the Investigation of Administrative Cases	May 26, 1940	
277	Reducing the Real Property Tax on All Permanent Plants and/or Trees Due for the Year Nineteen Hundred and Forty	May 29, 1940	
278	Further Amending Executive Order No. 233, Dated November 8, 1939, Entitled "Fixing the Maximum Selling Prices of Certain Articles of Prime Necessity," as Amended by Executive Order No. 237, Dated November 29, 1939	June 7, 1940	
279	Allowing Certain Reserve Officers of the Philippine Army to Possess Firearms Under Certificate of Registration	June 7, 1940	
280	Abolishing the Barrio of Jesus in the Municipality of Babatngon, Leyte, and Annexing Its Territory to the Barrio of Planza, Same Municipality	June 7, 1940	
281	Effectuating the Purposes of General Ruling No. 5, June 6, 1940, of the Secretary of the Treasury of the United States, Approved June 6, 1940, by the President of the United States, Under Section 5 (B) of the Act of October 6, 1917 (40 Stat. 411), as Amended, Executive Order No. 8389 of April 10, 1940, as Amended, of the President of the United States and Regulations Issued Pursuant Thereto and Under All Other Authority of Law	June 15, 1940	
282	Amending Executive Order No. 281, Dated June 15, 1940, Effectuating the Purposes of General Ruling No. 5, June 6, 1940, of the Secretary of the Treasury of the United States, Approved June 6, 1940, by the President of the United States, Under Section 5 (B) of the Act of October 6, 1917 (40 Stat. 411), as Amended, Executive Order No. 8389 of April 10, 1940, as of the President of the United States and Regulations Issued Pursuant Thereto and Under All Other Authority of Law	June 22, 1940	
283	Creating a Sugar Advisory Committee, Defining Its Purposes, Functions and Powers, and Designating the Secretary to the President, Until Otherwise Provided, to Administer the Sugar Adjustment and Stabilization Fund Created Under Commonwealth Act No. 567	June 22, 1940	
284	Ordering the Hospitalization of Accused Persons Needing Such Hospitalization in the Bilibid Prison Hospital	June 22, 1940	
285	Prescribing Regulations for the Preparation and Submission of Special Budgets Required by Section 7, Paragraph I-(4), of Commonwealth Act No. 246	June 24, 1940	
286	Revising Further Executive Order No. 135 Dated December 31, 1937, Establishing a Classification of Roads	July 8, 1940	
287	Reducing the Real Property Tax on Coconut Trees and Abaca Plants Due for the Year Nineteen Hundred and Forty in the City of Davao	July 8, 1940	
288	Reducing the Real Property Tax on Coconut Trees and Abaca Plants Due for the Year Nineteen Hundred and Forty and Remitting the Penalty of the First Installment of the Tax Due on All Real Property for the Year Nineteen Hundred and Forty in the City of Zamboanga, Subject to Certain Condition	July 8, 1940	
289	Revising Further Executive Order No. 72 Dated December 3, 1936, Establishing a Classification of Ports	July 8, 1940	
290	Promulgating Rules and Regulations Governing the Giving of Security for Every Firearm Held Under the Provisions of Section 888 of the Revised Administrative Code	July 8, 1940	
291	Creating the Philippine Exposition Commission to Manage and Direct the Exposition to be Inaugurated in 1941	August 5, 1940	
292	Establishing the Manila Port Area Rat-Proof Building Zone	August 5, 1940	
293	Enjoining Provincial and Municipal Treasurers Who are Appointed Agents of the Agricultural and Industrial Bank Even Without Compensation to Comply Faithfully with the Rules and Regulations or Instructions of the Bank and Not Exact Unauthorized Fees from the Applicants for Loans	August 5, 1940	
294	Amending Executive Order No. 47, Dated July 7, 1936, Fixing the Width of Road and Street Rights-of-Way Through Public Land	August 5, 1940	
295	Segregating from the Municipality of Santa Barbara, Province of Iloilo, the Barrio of Zarraga and Organizing the Same into a Separate Municipality Under the Name of Zarraga, with the Seat of Government at the Barrio of Zarraga	August 12, 1940	
296	Segregating from the Municipality of Jordan, Province of Iloilo, the Former Municipality of Nueva Valenca, and Organizing the Same into an Independent Municipality Under the Name of Nueva Valencia, with the Seat of Government at the Barrio of Santa Ana	August 12, 1940	
297	Designating the National Trading Corporation as the Agency to Handle and Take Charge of All Government Activities Relating to the Promotion, Organization and Supervision of Cooperative or Mutual Aid Associations	August 12, 1940	
298	Prohibiting the Automatic Renewal of Contracts, Requiring Public Bidding Before Entering into New Contracts, and Providing Exceptions Therefor	August 12, 1940	
299	Creating a National Social Security Administration and Revising Further, for This Purpose, Executive Order No. 139, Dated January 14, 1938, as Revised by Executive Order No. 188, Dated February 23, 1939, Executive Order No. 197, Dated March 24, 1939, and Executive Order No. 216, Dated July 28, 1939	August 19, 1940	
300	Placing the Bureau of Immigration Under the Supervision and Control of the Office of the President of the Philippines	September 3, 1940	
301	Designating the Philippine National Bank as One of the Agencies to Carry Out the Objectives of Commonwealth Act Numbered Six Hundred	September 10, 1940	
302	Superseding Executive Order Numbered Ninety-Three, as Amended by Executive Order Numbered One Hundred and Twenty-Six, Both Series of Nineteen Hundred and Thirty-Seven, Providing for the Control of Unused and Dormant Supplies and Equipment of the National Government and Prescribing the Procedure to be Followed in Making Regular and Emergency Purchases of Supplies, Materials, Furniture and Equipment and in Ordering Repairs of Furniture and Equipment	September 26, 1940	
303	Promulgating Rules and Regulations Governing the Appointment and Supervision of Government Pensionados	September 26, 1940	
304	Creating Investigating Committees on Veterans' Pension, Requiring City and Municipal Treasurers to Perform Certain Duties in Connection with Such Pension and Enjoining All Officers and Employees of the Philippine Government to Render Necessary Assistance to Applicants Therefor	October 8, 1940	
305	Designating Provincial, City, and Municipal Treasurers, Librarians of the Branches of the National Library, and Principals of Central Schools to Sell and Distribute Government Publications	October 19, 1940	
306	Revising Executive Order No. 73, Series of 1936, Establishing and Classifying Airports and Landing Fields as Amended by Executive Order No. 136, Dated December 31, 1937	October 21, 1940	
307	Prescribing Rules and Regulations to Govern the Employment of Common and Semiskilled Laborers in Public Works, Supplementing for This Purpose the Provisions of Executive Order No. 299, Dated August 19, 1940	October 22, 1940	
308	Creating a Committee to Revise and Codify the Existing Substantive Laws of the Philippines, and Providing for the Expenses to be Incurred Thereby	November 7, 1940	
309	Amending Further Executive Order No. 47, Dated July 7, 1936 as Amended by Executive Order No. 294, Dated August 5, 1940, Fixing the Width of Road and Street Rights-of-Way Through Public Land	November 22, 1940	
310	Creating the Philippines Heraldry Committee to Make a Study of, and Recommend Ways and Means for, the Adoption of the Coat-of-Arms of the Different Political Subdivisions, Provinces, Cities, and Semi-Governmental Institutions	December 4, 1940	
311	Revising Further Executive Order No. 135, Dated December 31, 1937, as Amended, Establishing a Classification of Roads	December 17, 1940	
312	Declaring That Portion of the Benguet Road (Kennon Road) from Klondyke's Spring to Camp Six Within the Mountain Province a Toll Road and Fixing a Schedule of Fees for the Collection of Tolls Thereon	December 23, 1940	
313	Rules and Regulations Governing the Use of the Coat-of-Arms of the Philippines and the Great Seal of the Government as Authorized in Commonwealth Act No. 602	December 23, 1940	
314	Transferring Powers, Functions, Duties, Appropriations Property, and Records from Various Statistical Agencies to the Bureau of the Census and Statistics	December 24, 1940	
315	Confirming the Elections of Provincial and City Officers Elected on December 10, 1940	December 28, 1940	
316	Segregating from the Municipality of Guinayangan, Province of Tayabas, the Barrios of Aloneros, Bagong Silang, Balogo, Cabibihan, Catimo, Danlagan, Kabugwang, Kandalapdap, Malbog, Monato, Mañgayaw, Quinatacutan, Siguiwan, Tagcawayan, and Triumfo, and Organizing the Same into an Independent Municipality Under the Name of Tagcawayan, with the Seat of Government at the Barrio of Tagcawayan	December 31, 1940	

== 1941 ==
No.	Title	Date signed	Ref.
317	Organizing the Department of Health and Public Welfare	January 7, 1941	
318	Regulating the Operation of Cockpits	January 24, 1941	
319	Regulating the Operation of Night Clubs, Cabarets, Dancing Schools, and Dance Halls	January 25, 1941	
320	Regulating the Maintenance and Operation of Race Tracks and Horse Racing	January 27, 1941	
321	Prescribing Measures for the Reduction of the Expenditures of the National Government to Meet Expected Reductions in Revenues	January 27, 1941	
322	Providing for Rules and Regulations Governing the Organization, Operation and Dissolution of Cooperative Associations	February 5, 1941	
323	Revising Further Executive Order No. 135, Dated December 31, 1937, as Amended, Establishing a Classification of Roads	February 5, 1941	
324	Prescribing Regulations Governing the Approval of Applications for Vacation and Sick Leave of Officers and Employees of the Government	February 11, 1941	
325	Revising Executive Order No. 290, Dated July 8, 1940, Promulgating Rules and Regulations Governing the Giving of Security for Every Firearm Held Under the Provisions of Section 888 of the Revised Administrative Code	February 13, 1941	
326	Regulating the Operation of "Bars"	February 19, 1941	
327	Regulating Billiard and Pool Halls, and Bowling Alleys	February 19, 1941	
328	Regulating the Reappointment or Reinstatement of Officers and Employees Who Resign to Engage in Political Activity	February 19, 1941	
329	Reducing by Thirty Per Centum the Tax on All Permanent Plants and/or Trees All the Provinces and the Cities of Davao and Zamboanga for the Calendar Year Nineteen Hundred and Forty-One	March 7, 1941	
330	Amending Executive Order No. 316, Organizing the Municipality of Tagcawayan, Tayabas	March 7, 1941	
331	Revising Further Executive Order No. 135 Dated December 31, 1937, as Amended, Establishing a Classification of Roads	March 11, 1941	
332	Prohibiting the Payment of Additional Compensation to Officers and Employees of the National Government Including Those on the Boards of Management of Government-Owned and Controlled Enterprises	March 14, 1941	
333	Prohibiting the Exportation of Rice	March 20, 1941	
334	Amending Executive Order No. 333 Dated March 20, 1941, Entitled "Prohibiting the Exportation of Rice"	March 22, 1941	
335	Creating a Civilian Emergency Administration, Defining Its Powers and Duties and Providing for the Coordination and Control of Civilian Organizations for the Protection of the Civil Population in Extraordinary and Emergency Conditions	April 1, 1941	
336	Defining the Territorial Limits of the City of Tagaytay	April 1, 1941	
337	Promulgating Rules and Regulations for the Organization and Training of Volunteer Guards	April 16, 1941	
338	Placing the Bureau of Immigration Under the Supervision and Control of the Department of Justice	May 1, 1941	
339	Requiring All Government Entities to Purchase a Reserve Supply of Oil Products for Possible Emergency Use	May 3, 1941	
340	Requiring Dealer, Distributions, Etc. to Report Stocks of Foods and Feeds in Their Possession and of Those Arriving Under Contract	May 3, 1941	
341	Revising the Rules and Regulations Governing the Use of the Coat-of-Arms of the Philippines and the Great Seal of the Government	May 3, 1941	
342	Granting Provincial Governors the Power of Supervision and Control Over Volunteer Guard Units in Their Respective Provinces	May 12, 1941	
343	Reorganizing the Barrios of Mahabang Parang and Sorosoro, Municipality of Batangas, Province of Batangas	May 12, 1941	
344	Requiring Certain Persons and Entities to Report Stocks of Essential Building Materials, Food Commodities, and Food Containers	May 17, 1941	
345	Designating the Department of Labor in Place of the Philippine National Bank as One of the Agencies to Carry Out the Objectives of Commonwealth Act No. 600	May 17, 1941	
346	Revoking Executive Order Numbered Three Hundred Thirty-One, Dated March 11, 1941, Revising Further Executive Order Numbered One Hundred Thirty-Five, Dated December 31, 1937, as Amended, Establishing a Classification of Roads	May 20, 1941	
347	Reducing by Thirty Per Centum the Tax on All Permanent Plants and/or Trees in the City of San Pablo for the Calendar Year Nineteen Hundred and Forty One	May 21, 1941	
348	Creating a Committee to Formulate a Comprehensive Plan for the Rebuilding of the Tondo Burnt Area of the City of Manila	May 24, 1941	
349	Creating a Board of Trustees to Administer the "F. R. S. Memorial Fund"	May 24, 1941	
350	Establishing a Public Assistance Service Under the Bureau of Public Welfare to Take Over the Relief and Other Activities of the Associated Charities of the Philippines	May 31, 1941	
351	Prohibiting Officers of Government-Owned Corporations and Their Wives and Other Members of Their Household from Entering into Contracts with the Corporations of Which They Are Officers	June 4, 1941	
352	Converting the Municipal District of Tagum, Province of Davao, into a Municipality Under the Same Name	June 27, 1941	
353	Segregating from the Municipality of Pagadian, Province of Zamboanga, the Barrios of Cebuano Barracks, Parasan and Tambulig and Organizing the Same into a Separate Municipality Under the Name of Aurora, with the Seat of Government at the Barrio of Cebuano Barracks	July 1, 1941	
354	Promulgating Certain Emergency Rules and Regulations Governing Electrical Communication and Radio Installation and Sale or Repair of Radio Apparatus or Parts Thereof	July 1, 1941	
355	Amending Paragraph (1) of Executive Order No. 335, Dated April 1, 1941, Creating a Civilian Emergency Administration	July 2, 1941	
356	Abolishing the Landed Estates Survey Committee, Created by Administrative Order No. 49, Dated October 7, 1937, and Transferring Its Functions and Duties to the Rural Progress Administration, Created by Executive Order No. 191, Dated March 2, 1939	July 25, 1941	
357	Revising Further Executive Order No. 135, Dated December 31, 1937, as Amended, Establishing a Classification of Roads	July 30, 1941	
358	Amending Executive Order No. 306, Dated October 21, 1940, Which Revised Executive Order No. 73, Series of 1936, Establishing and Classifying Airports and Landing Fields	August 4, 1941	
359	Creating the National Cooperatives Administration	August 5, 1941	
360	Creating the National Enterprises Control Board to Coordinate the Policies and to Supervise the Activities of the Government Corporations and Enterprises Engaged in Economic Activities	August 5, 1941	
361	Creating the Corps of Professors of the Philippine Military Academy and Providing Rules and Regulations for the Appointment and Promotion of Members Thereof	August 6, 1941	
362	Prescribing Rules and Regulations Concerning the Conduct of Persons During Obscuration of Lights (Blackouts) and During Air Raids	August 15, 1941	
363	Ordering the Transmission Free of Charge Over All Government Electrical Communication Systems for the Duration of the Present Emergency of All Messages Concerning Weather Conditions and Those Relating to the Enforcement of the Neutrality Rules and Regulations of the United States	August 20, 1941	
364	Segregating from the Municipality of Numancia, Province of Capiz, the Barrio of Lezo and Organizing the Same into a Separate Municipality Under the Name of Lezo, with the Seat of Government at the Barrio of Lezo	August 28, 1941	
365	Amending Paragraphs 3 and 8 of Executive Order No. 354, Dated July 1, 1941, Promulgating Certain Emergency Laws and Regulations Governing Electrical Communication and Radio Installation and Sale or Repair of Radio Apparatus or Parts Thereof	August 29, 1941	
366	Amending Further Paragraph 3(A) of Executive Order No. 255, Dated February 21, 1940, Fixing and Regulating the Collection of Wharf or Pier Charges for the Use of Port Facilities, as Amended by Executive Order No. 270, Dated April 25, 1940	August 30, 1941	
367	Amending Executive Order No. 357 Entitled "Revising Further Executive Order No. 135, Dated December 31, 1937, as Amended, Establishing a Classification of Roads"	September 1, 1941	
368	Procurement of Offshore Patrol Reserve Officers	September 9, 1941	
369	Revising Executive Order No. 274, Dated May 11, 1940, Fixing the Schedule of Per Diems for Provincial, City, and Municipal Officers and Employees	September 15, 1941	
370	Prescribing a Uniform Procedure for the Investigation of Administrative Cases and Revoking Executive Order No. 276	September 29, 1941	
371	Fixing the Maximum Selling Prices of Certain Articles of Price Necessity and Promulgating Rules and Regulations for the Enforcement Thereof	October 2, 1941	
372	Prohibiting for the Licensing by the Civilian Emergency Administration of the Sale, Distribution, or Other Disposition to the Public of Gas-Masks, Respirators, or Other Protective Devices Against Irritant or Poisonous Gases or Substances, Creating the Board of Inspectors for Gas-Masks, and Defining Its Functions and Duties	October 15, 1941	
373	Revising Further Executive Order No. 135, Dated December 31, 1937, as Amended, Establishing a Classification of Roads	October 30, 1941	
374	Providing for the Control and Regulation of the Shipment of Export Quota Sugar and for the Distribution of the Proceeds Thereof, and Creating a Sugar Control Authority for the Purpose	November 19, 1941	
375	Extending the Scope of the Powers Vested in the Sugar Control Authority by Executive Order No. 374 to Include the Control and Regulation of the Shipment of Export Sugar to Countries Other Than the United States and the Distribution of the Proceeds Thereof	December 3, 1941	
376	Revising Administrative Order No. 107 Dated October 2, 1939, Entitled "Creating an Emergency Control Board"	December 6, 1941	
377	Prohibiting Excessive Withdrawal of Deposits in All Banking Institutions in the Philippines	December 8, 1941	
378	Amending Paragraph (1) of Executive Order No. 335, Dated April 1, 1941, Creating a Civilian Emergency Administration	December 10, 1941	
379	Declaring Executive Order No. 213, Dated July 10, 1939, Entitled "Annexing a Certain Portion of the Territory of the Municipality of Majayjay, Province of Laguna, to the Municipality of Lilio, Same Province," to be in Full Force and Effect	December 10, 1941	
380	Amending Further Paragraph 8 of Executive Order No. 354, Dated July 1, 1941, Entitled "Promulgating Certain Emergency Rules and Regulations Governing Electrical Communication and Radio Installation and Sale or Repair of Radio Apparatus," as Amended by Executive Order No. 365, Dated August 29, 1941	December 11, 1941	
381	Providing for the Establishment of Priorities in Telephone and Telegraph Service and Creating Therefor a Telephone and Telegraph Priorities Board	December 11, 1941	
382	Authorizing the Commandeering of Food, Fuel, Building Materials, and Other Articles or Commodities of Prime Necessity, Prohibiting and Penalizing the Hoarding Thereof, and Providing for a More Effective Enforcement of the Provisions of All Anti-Profiteering Orders	December 15, 1941	
383	Amending Executive Order No. 377, Dated December 8, 1941, Entitled "Prohibiting Excessive Withdrawal of Deposits in All Banking Institutions in the Philippines"	December 16, 1941	
384	Fixing Hours of Labor During the Present Emergency	December 16, 1941	
385	Transferring from the General Auditing Office the Function of Preparing and Keeping the Accounts of the Various Departments, Bureaus, Offices, and Dependencies of the National Government, Including the Supreme Court, the Court of Appeals, the Commission on Elections, and the University of the Philippines, as Well as the Functions of Acting Upon Requisitions for Supplies, Materials, and Equipment, and of Operating the Salvage Warehouse	December 17, 1941	
386	Placing the Red Stripe of the Filipino Flag Up During the Present Emergency	December 18, 1941	
387	Fixing the Schedule of Burial Expenses in Case of Death from Injuries Received or Sickness Contracted in Performance of Duty	December 18, 1941	
388	Placing the Bureau of Immigration Under the Office of the President	December 22, 1941	
389	Directing the Immediate Arrest and Vigorous Protection of Persons Pillaging, Looting or Committing Other Acts of Lawlessness Against the Civilian Population	December 22, 1941	
390	Prescribing the Order of Presidential Succession and Abolishing the Department of the Interior	December 22, 1941	
391	Authorizing Provincial, City, and Municipal Governments to Incur in Overdrafts for the Payment of Salaries of Their Officers and Employees and Expenses for Essential Activities	December 22, 1941	
392	Authorizing the Food Administrator to Take Over Farm Lands and to Require Able-Bodied Citizens to Engage in Farming and Other Productive Activities	December 23, 1941	
393	Providing for the Free Transmission of Mails of United States Army and Navy Officers and Men	December 23, 1941	
394	Establishing an Inter-Island Shipping Authority, War Risk Insurance for Vessels Engaged in the Coast-Wide Trade and Appropriating for That Purpose Five Million Pesos from the Funds in the Philippine Treasury Set Aside for Defense and Civilian Protection Measures	December 24, 1941	
395	Providing for an Increase in the Number of Justices of the Court of Appeals and of the Judges of the Court of First Instance of the Fourth Judicial District; and Investing Judges Appointed Under Commonwealth Act No. 504 (Cadastral) with General Jurisdiction	December 24, 1941	
396	Reorganizing and Grouping the Executive Departments of the Government	December 24, 1941	
397	Exempting the Harbor Police Force in Matters of Appointments, Promotions, Discipline and Removal from the Civil Service Rules and Regulations	December 24, 1941	
398	Permitting Registration and Deposit of Philippine Government Securities with the Treasurer of the Philippines	December 24, 1941	
399	Amending Paragraph 4 of Executive Order No. 326	December 29, 1941	

== 1942 ==
No.	Title	Date signed	Ref.
400	Creating the City of Greater Manila	January 1, 1942	
401	Conferring Jurisdiction on the Court of First Instance of Iloilo to Try Crimes Committed in the Province of Masbate	February 26, 1942	
402	Authorizing and Empowering Colonel Manuel Roxas, Secretary to the President, to Act for and in Behalf of the President of the Philippines	March 26, 1942	
1-W	Amending Rules and Regulations Governing the Appointment and Supervision of Government Pensionados	May 13, 1942	
2-W	Creating Commission of Officers of the Philippine Army Who Will be Commissioned by the Army of the United States	June 16, 1942	
3-W	Classifying University of the Philippine Fellows as Philippine Government Pensionados	June 17, 1942	
5-W	Creating the Office of Special Services	October 11, 1942	

== 1943 ==
No.	Title	Date signed	Ref.
6-W	Creating a Committee on Relief for Destitute Filipinos in the United States and Hawaii	January 29, 1943	
7-W	Creating a Post-War Planning Board	September 15, 1943	
8-W	Organizing the Department of Information and Public Relations and Transferring to It the Powers, Functions and Duties, as Well as the Personnel, Appropriations, and Properties of the Office of Special Services, Office of the President of the Philippines	October 1, 1943	

== 1944 ==
No.	Title	Date signed	Ref.
9-W	Detailing All Government Pensionados to the Post-War Planning Board	February 2, 1944	
10-W	Increasing the Membership of the Post-War Planning Board	March 16, 1944	
11-W	Extending Further the Suspension of Granting Geological Exploration and Petroleum Drilling Leases	March 31, 1944	
12-W	Creating the Division of Civil Affairs, Philippine Army, in the Department of National Defense	June 20, 1944	
13-W	Creating the Philippine Commonwealth Relief Committee	June 20, 1944	
14-W	Creating the Currency Committee	June 20, 1944	
